Tawassul is an Arabic word originated from wa-sa-la- wasilat. The wasilah is a means by which a person, goal or objective is approached, attained or achieved. In another version of the meaning of tawassul in another text: Tawassul is an Arabic word that comes from a verbal noun, wasilah, which according to Ibn Manzur (d. 711/1311) in Lisān al-'Arab means "a station of King, a rank, or act of devotion".
In other words, it refers to a position of power due to one's proximity to the king or sovereign. While the tawassul or tawassulan is the use of wasilah for this purpose. In religious contexts, the tawassul is the use of a wasilah to arrive at or obtain favour of Allah.

Etymology
Tawassul is an Arabic word that comes from a verbal noun, "wasilah", which means "closeness, nearness, proximity, neighbourship". According to Ibn Manzur (d. 711/1311) in Lisān al-'Arab, wasilah means "a station with King, a rank, or act of devotion.
The word wasilat had been stated in the Quran two times ([5:35],[17:57]). It is translated as “a means that can be used to gain nearness to God”. Therefore, the typical meaning of tawassul or tawassulanis use of wasilat to obtain nearness to God.

Concept
Tawassul, as the main habitude of supplications, has key role in to acceptation of them.

O you who believe! be careful of (your duty to) Allah and seek means (wasilah) of nearness to Him and strive hard in His way that you may be successful (Q5:35)

Some classical commentators, including the great Sufi exegetes, such as al-Qushayri (d. 465/1074) explain the use of al-wasilah in this verse to mean avoiding what is prohibited, fulfilling what is enjoined on us, and drawing near to God through good actions. Both Raghib al-Isfahani and Sayyid Muhammad Husayn Tabataba'i opine that al-wasilah means to reach a certain goal through desire, inclination and willingness, and in fact wasilah towards God means observance of his path with knowledge and worship through adherence to the Sharia. It can be deduced from the verse above that intercession (tawassul) is only with the "permission" of Allah. Also, the practice of seeking intercession began during the time of the Islamic prophet Muhammad. An oft-cited Hadith in support of this is one narrated from Uthman ibn Hunaif regarding a blind man who Muslims believe was healed through the process.

The Hadith is as follows:

Various episodes from the life of Muhammad depict him interceding on behalf of his companions, mostly asking God to forgive their sins (Istighfar). For example, Aisha relates that he often slipped quietly from her side at night to go to the cemetery of Al-Baqi' to beseech forgiveness of God for the dead. Similarly, his istighfar is mentioned in the Salat al-Janazah and its efficacy explained.

Another early example of tawassul is represented by the idea of turning to God by means of Muhammad. This appears in an account concerning the story of a blind man who asked Muhammad to pray to God for his health because of his blindness. This hadith is quoted in some major collections of traditions, such as Ahmad ibn Hanbal's musnad:

In the Quran
The Qur'an states: This verse raised the question as to whether or not Muhammad's mediation was still possible after his death. A number of Islamic scholars including Al-Nawawi, Ibn Kathir and Ibn al-Athir in his exegesis relates the following episode, aiming to demonstrate its effectiveness:

A Bedouin of the desert visited the Prophet’s tomb and greeted the Prophet, addressing him directly as if he were alive. “Peace upon you, Messenger of God!” Then he said, “I heard the word of God ‘If, when they had wronged themselves . . .,’ I came to you seeking pardon for my mistakes, longing for your intercession with our Lord!” The Bedouin then recited a poem in praise of the Prophet and departed. The person who witnessed the story says that he fell asleep, and in a dream he saw the Prophet saying to him, “O ‘Utbi, rejoin our brother the Bedouin and announce [to] him the good news that God has pardoned him!”

The Qur'an also states:The above verse lay emphasis on four things:
 Faith
 Piety (Taqwa)
 Search for means of approach
 Struggle for Allah's sake

According to the verse, the third regulation after faith in God and piety is " seeking means (of approach to) His (presence and to His nearness and accessibility)". Some of the religious scholars have interpreted wasilah (the means of approach) mentioned in the Quranic verse as faith and good deeds while others, who are majority have explained the word as the prophets, the righteous and favorites of Allah.
Also, the verse reveals that a person seeking means of approach to Allah will have in the first instance a believer and Muttaqeen (a person who fear Allah). Thus wasilah does not amount to associating partner with Allah but rather reaffirms the oneness of Allah, according to the opinion of Muhammad Tahir-ul-Qadri.

Types
There is this agreement among Muslim theologians that a means (tawassul) is acceptable concepts to draw near to Allah but they can't gain unanimity on what kind of means (Tawassul) is permissible. According to the main agreement people can draw near to Allah and invoke him by using of these permissible means such as their good act (their prayer, fasting and reciting the Quran) but there is the discussion on approach to Allah by means of the person of Muhammad and his dignity or other pious Muslims after the death.

Sunni perspective 

Various episodes from the life of Muhammad depict him interceding on behalf of his companions, mostly asking God to forgive their sins (Istighfar). For example, Aisha relates that he often slipped quietly from her side at night to go to the cemetery of Al-Baqi' to beseech forgiveness of God for the dead....Similarly, his istighfar is mentioned in the Salat al-Janazah... and its efficacy explained.

All jurists comprising Imami, Shafi'i, Maliki, Hanafi and Hanbali are unanimous on the permissibility of tawassul whether during the lifetime of Muhammad or after his death. 
Syrian Islamic scholars Salih al-Nu`man, Abu Sulayman Suhayl al-Zabibi, and Mustafa ibn Ahmad al-Hasan al-Shatti al-Hanbali al-Athari al-Dimashqi have similarly released Fatwas in support of the practice.

Al-Suyuti in his book History of the Caliphs also reports Caliph Umar's prayer for rain after the death of Muhammad and specifies that on that occasion ‘Umar was wearing his mantle (al-burda), a detail confirming his tawassul through Muhammad at that occasion. Sahih al-Bukhari narrates similar situation as:

Shia perspective

Seeking Intercession (tawassul) is accepted and even advised in Shi'a Islam. Shia Scholars refer to Quranic verses such as 5:3, 12:97 and 12:98 and justify its permissibility. During the tawassul prayer Shia Muslims call on the names of Muhammad and the Ahl al-Bayt and use them as their intercessors/intermediaries to God. Shias always pray to and only to Allah, but as other Muslims, they accept tawassul as a means of seeking intercession.

Shia Muslims consider that Tawassul through prophets and Imams is the great justification of wasilah, because they had gain to the high degree of humanity and after death, they are alive and they are blessed by Allah. So they are kind of means that people use to gain nearness to Allah. Shia Muslim does not consider Tawasull as Bid‘ah and Shirk. According to their tenets, when Tawassul is forbidden that people don't attention that these means was created by Allah and their effect is raised from him.

Shia Muslim visit from grave of Shia Imam and prophets of Allah and consider it as means to gain nearness to Allah.

References

Further reading
 Chiabotti, Francesco, Shafa'a (Intercession), in Muhammad in History, Thought, and Culture: An Encyclopedia of the Prophet of God (2 vols.), Edited by C. Fitzpatrick and A. Walker, Santa Barbara, ABC-CLIO, 2014.

External links
 Supplication through the Prophet Muhammad (al-tawassul) — Dar al-Ifta al-Misriyyah
 Intercession in Islam 
 Tawassul in the Sunnah 
 The Intermediary of Shirk by Sayyid Muhammad Alawi al-Maliki 
 Tawassul: Is it permissible?. - 
 Position of Tawassul and Waseela in Islam
 Tawassul: Tawassul seeking way unto Allah. 
 The Hadith Proofs for Tawassul (Intercession)

Islamic terminology
Islamic prayer
Salah
Sufism
Shia Islam